Peter Joseph Fanta (born 1961) is a former Deputy Assistant Secretary of Defense for Nuclear Matters who served in February 2018. 

He is a retired Rear Admiral of the United States Navy. His final active duty assignment was as director of Warfare Integration. He previously served as Commander, Expeditionary Strike Group Five.

Biography
Fanta is a native of Manitowoc, Wisconsin. He holds an M.P.A. from Harvard University and an M.A. in National Security and Strategic Studies from the Naval War College.

Career
Fanta graduated from the United States Naval Academy in 1983. Other assignments have included serving as an executive assistant to the Assistant Secretary of the Navy (Financial Management and Comptroller).

As of December 2016, he was serving as the Navy's Director of Surface Warfare.

Awards and honors
Awards he has received include the:
Legion of Merit (4)
Defense Superior Service Medal (2)
Meritorious Service Medal  (2)
Navy and Marine Corps Commendation Medal (3)

References

External links

1961 births
Living people
People from Manitowoc, Wisconsin
United States Naval Academy alumni
Military personnel from Wisconsin
Naval War College alumni
Harvard Kennedy School alumni
Recipients of the Legion of Merit
United States Navy rear admirals (upper half)
Recipients of the Defense Superior Service Medal
United States Department of Defense officials